Rodrigo de Quiroga López de Ulloa (c. 1512 – February 20, 1580) was a Spanish conquistador of Galician origin. He was twice the Royal Governor of Chile.

Early life
He was the son of Hernado Camba de Quiroga and of María López de Ulloa. In the year 1535 he traveled to Peru and participated in the exploration of Gran Chaco in the expedition of Diego de Rojas. A year later, he accompanied a group led by the conquistador Francisco de Aguirre as they made their way to Chile. This group met up with Pedro de Valdivia in Atacama.

In Chile
Quiroga participated in the military actions of the conquest of Chile, during the first part of the War of Arauco, coming to be one of the most important captains of the district. From 1548 he held a number of important posts in the administration in Santiago. Three times he was mayor, amongst other duties.

He married Inés de Suárez, the famous mistress of Pedro de Valdivia, when the Viceroy of Peru at the time ordered that Valdivia end the scandalous relationship or face excommunication.

At the death of Valdivia at the hands of the Mapuches at the Battle of Tucapel, the citizens of southern Chile followed the instructions of his will and announced Francisco de Villagra as their leader. However, in Santiago, the ruling cabildo ignored these recommendations and proclaimed Quiroga as governor. It was thus that there were for a time two governors in Chile: Villagra in the south and Quiroga in the north. The situation ended upon the return of Villagra from the southern war zone to reclaim his right to govern. The cabildo awarded him this right and obliged Quiroga to relinquish his power, which Quiroga grudgingly did.

In 1565, the Viceroy Lope García de Castro sent reinforcements from Peru under the command of general Jerónimo de Castilla. Castilla had orders to arrest Pedro de Villagra (the uncle of Francisco who had risen to the post of governor while protected by the previous Viceroy), and put Quiroga in his place. In these circumstances, Villagra saw that he was too weak to defend his title, so he ceded his power to Quiroga and went to Peru.

First government

This first government (not counting the earlier one, which was never imbued with real power) lasted until 1567. It was marked by constant clashes with the Indians, which often resulted in victories. Quiroga launched a new campaign, organized by Lorenzo Bernal del Mercado. He built forts at Lebu, Quiapo, reconstructed Cañete, and repopulated Arauco in 1566. He accomplished the conquest of the island of Chiloé, sending his Lieutenant Governor Martín Ruiz de Gamboa to establish the city of Castro there, and pacifying its inhabitants, the docile Cuncos.

Despite these triumphs, the court did not recognize his strengths, and upon returning to the capital, he found that the Real Audiencia of Chile had replaced him. For a while, he retreated from political life and dedicated himself to business.

Second government
In 1575, however, as a result of a dispute between the Real Audiencia and the governor at the time, Melchor Bravo de Saravia, he was called a second time to take charge of the Reino of Chile. He was sworn in that same year in front of the cabildo. Quiroga's second administration was more turbulent then the first. In addition to the ongoing war of Arauco, there were incursions by pirates, two earthquakes (in 1575) and a dispute with the bishop of San Miguel over the naming of ecclesiastical posts and the reduction of the income of the clerics, which put him in danger of excommunication.

Spain promised to send him 500 reinforcements to decisively end the war, but only 300 arrived. In addition, this smaller force was of much lesser quality than hoped and was almost completely without equipment. Overcoming these difficulties and his sickness (he had to be carried by chair to the battlefield), Quiroga launched a new offensive against the Mapuches, this time led by their toqui the mestizo Alonso Díaz.

The campaign had relative success, which allowed Quiroga to confront another menace, the appearance of Sir Francis Drake off the Chilean coasts. Drake managed to sack the port of Valparaíso, but when he tried to repeat the action at La Serena, he encountered the armed resistance of the inhabitants, and was repulsed.

Valdivia earthquake

On December 16, 1575 an earthquake struck southern Chile, and ruined the cities of La Imperial, Villarrica, Osorno, Castro, and specially the city of Valdivia, where the quake caused a landslide that plugged the drainage of Lake Riñihue. The water then accumulated until it eventually destroyed this natural dam, creating a secondary flood and disaster.

Later life
Quiroga's grave sickness impeded him from continuing to direct the war, and he handed the task over to his son-in-law Martín Ruiz de Gamboa.  Prostrated in his bed by his pain, in his last days he dedicated himself to religious observance, circled by monks to whose monasteries he would give a majority of his goods. He died quietly on February 25, 1580. His wife, Inés de Suárez, would die the same year.

See also
Arauco War
Paineñamcu

Notes

Sources

1512 births
1580 deaths
Galician conquistadors
Royal Governors of Chile
Spanish conquistadors
Spanish generals
16th-century Spanish people